Sloterdijk may refer to:

 Sloterdijk, Amsterdam, a quarter in Amsterdam
Amsterdam Sloterdijk station
Sloterdijk train collision which occurred nearby
 MV Sloterdyk, a ship of the Holland America Line

People with the surname
 Peter Sloterdijk (born 1947), German philosopher